The Victoria's Secret Fashion Show is an annual fashion show sponsored by Victoria's Secret, a brand of lingerie and sleepwear. Victoria's Secret uses the show to promote and market its goods in high-profile settings. The show features some of the world's leading fashion models, such as current Victoria's Secret Angels Tyra Banks, Heidi Klum, Daniela Peštová, Gisele Bündchen, and Adriana Lima.

The Victoria's Secret Fashion Show 2001 was recorded in New York, United States at the Bryant Park. The show featured musical performances by Andrea Bocelli and Mary J. Blige. Angel Heidi Klum was wearing the Victoria's Secret Fantasy Bra: The Heavenly Star Bra worth $12,500,000.

Fashion show segments

Special Performance

Segment 1

Special Performance

Segment 2

Index

Finale

Angels: Gisele Bündchen, Heidi Klum, Adriana Lima, Tyra Banks, Daniela Peštová.

Returning models: Karolína Kurková, Caroline Ribeiro, Eva Herzigová, Mini Andén, Fernanda Tavares, Trish Goff, Bridget Hall, Aurélie Claudel, Rhea Durham, Alessandra Ambrosio, Inés Rivero.

Newcomers: Rie Rasmussen, Maggie Rizer, Alek Wek, Omahyra Mota, Karen Elson, Molly Sims, Audrey Marnay, Diána Mészáros, Anouck Lepere, Emma Heming.

External links 

 VSFS 2001 Gallery

Victoria's Secret
2001 in fashion